The NAB AFL Rising Star award is given annually to a standout young player in the Australian Football League (AFL).

Eligibility
Every round, a nomination is given to a standout young player who performed well during that particular round. To be eligible for nomination, a player must be under 21 on 1 January of that year and have played ten or fewer senior games before the start of the season; a player who is suspended may be nominated, but is not eligible to win the award.

Nominations

Final voting

References

Afl Rising Star, 2020